HSwMS Nordkaparen (Nor), was the fifth boat of the Draken-class submarine of the Swedish Navy.

Construction and career 
HSwMS Nordkaparen was launched on 8 March 1961 by Saab Kockums, Malmö and commissioned on 4 April 1962.

On 18 September 1980, Nordkaparen was extremely close to colliding with a foreign submarine between Utö and Huvudskär. During a speed test, Nordkaparen operated together with one of the navy's helicopters for anti-submarine warfare. This had its hydrophone immersed in the water. Just as the submarine was about to begin testing, Nordkaparen was called by the helicopter, which wondered if there were two submarines that would perform speed tests. The submarine replied that it was alone and stepped to the surface for safety reasons. Just as Nordkaparen broke the water surface, a submarine passed under the keel of the Swedish submarine by a margin of a few decimetres. The incident was followed by a two-week submarine hunt.

She was decommissioned in 1988 and became a museum ship in Maritiman, Gothenburg.

Gallery

References 

Draken-class submarines
Ships built in Malmö
1961 ships
Museum ships in Sweden